Katharinenberg bei Wunsiedel is a mountain close to the town of Wunsiedel in Bavaria, Germany.

Mountains of Bavaria